Tiffany Tshilumba (born 28 October 1996) is a Luxembourgish sprinter. She competed in the 60 metres event at the 2014 IAAF World Indoor Championships. Her father is originally from the Democratic Republic of the Congo.

References

1996 births
Living people
Luxembourgian female sprinters
Luxembourgian people of Democratic Republic of the Congo descent
Place of birth missing (living people)
European Games competitors for Luxembourg
Athletes (track and field) at the 2015 European Games